The Mid-Hudson Athletic League (MHAL) is an inter-scholastic high school sports program located within Section IX of the New York State Public High School Athletic Association.

Schools 
MHAL sports are split into four divisions, with the best division teams earning playoff spots. The divisions, and schools within each, are as follows:
Division I: Hyde Park (FDR), Poughkeepsie, Wallkill, Saugerties
Division II: Marlboro, Rondout Valley, Highland, New Paltz, Red Hook
Division III: Spackenkill, Onteora, Dover, Ellenville
Division IV: Coleman Catholic,  Millbrook, Webutuck, Pine Plains, Rhinebeck

Current champions
The reigning MHAL Champions are as follows:
Fall (2009)
Boys' cross country - Red Hook
Girls' cross country - Onteora
Field hockey - Kingston
Golf - Rondout
Boys' soccer - Red Hook/Rhinebeck
Girls' soccer - Red Hook
Girls' tennis - Spackenkill
Volleyball - Red Hook

Winter (2009 - 2010)
Boys' basketball - Red Hook
Girls' basketball - Coleman Catholic
Gymnastics - Kingston
Wrestling - n/a

Spring (2010)
Baseball - 
Softball - 
Boys' tennis - Hyde Park (FDR)
Boys' track - Ellenville/New Paltz 
Girls' track - Rondout Valley

Past champions
The complete list of past MHAL Champions from 1998 can be found at the league's website.

References

External links 
Section IX Athletics (Includes Mid-Hudson Athletic League information
[https://web.archive.org/web/20080613025132/http://www.mhal.info/14264.html/ Section IX Athletics Past Champions

High school sports conferences and leagues in the United States
Sports competitions in New York (state)